Isocorypha is a genus of moths belonging to the family Tineidae.

Species 
Isocorypha limbata Walsingham, 1914

References

Tineidae
Tineidae genera